The Thomas Jefferson Medal for Distinguished Achievement in the Arts, Humanities, and Social Sciences is awarded by the American Philosophical Society and is that society's "highest award for the arts, humanities, and social sciences."

The Thomas Jefferson Medal was authorized by an act of Congress in 1993, in honor of the 250th anniversary of the founding of the American Philosophical Society.

Recipients

Thomas Jefferson Medal recipients are as follows:

2018
 Toni Morrison

2007
 Richard Rorty

2005
 Elliott Carter

2004
 Bernard M. W. Knox

2003
 Frederick H. Burkhardt

2002
 Bernard Lewis

2001
 I.M. Pei

2000
 Helen Hennessey Vendler

1999
 Daniel J. Boorstin

1998
 Albert O. Hirschman

1997
 Roland M. Frye

1996
 Homer Thompson

1995
 George F. Kennan

1994
 Arthur Link

1993
 King Juan Carlos I, on behalf of Spain
 Bernard Bailyn
 Warren E. Burger
 John Hope Franklin
 Peter Paret
 Hanna Gray
 Daniel Patrick Moynihan

See also
 Lists of humanities awards
 List of general awards in the humanities

References 

Awards established in 1993
Humanities awards